Robert Clifton Weaver (December 29, 1907 – July 17, 1997) was an American economist, academic, and political administrator who served as the first United States secretary of housing and urban development (HUD) from 1966 to 1968, when the department was newly established by President Lyndon B. Johnson. Weaver was the first African American to be appointed to a US cabinet-level position.

Prior to his appointment as cabinet officer, Weaver had served in the administration of President John F. Kennedy. In addition, he had served in New York State government, and in high-level positions in New York City. During the Franklin D. Roosevelt administration, he was one of 45 prominent African Americans appointed to positions and helped make up the Black Cabinet, an informal group of African-American public policy advisers.  Weaver directed federal programs during the administration of the New Deal, at the same time completing his doctorate in economics in 1934 at Harvard University.

Background

Robert Clifton Weaver was born on December 29, 1907, into a middle-class family in Washington, D.C. His parents were Mortimer Grover Weaver, a postal worker, and Florence (Freeman) Weaver. They encouraged him in his academic studies. His maternal grandfather was Dr. Robert Tanner Freeman, the first African American to graduate from Harvard in dentistry.

The young Weaver attended the M Street High School, now known as the Dunbar High School. The high school for blacks at a time of racial segregation had a national reputation for academic excellence. Weaver went on to Harvard University, where he earned a Bachelor of Science and Master of Arts degree.  He also earned a Doctor of Philosophy degree in Economics, completing his doctorate in 1934.

Career

Government

Washington

In 1934, Weaver was appointed as an aide to United States Secretary of the Interior Harold L. Ickes.  In 1938, he became special assistant to the US Housing Authority.  In 1942, he became administrative assistant to the National Defense Advisory Commission, the War Manpower Commission (1942), and director of Negro Manpower Service.

With a reputation for knowledge about housing issues, in 1934 the young Weaver was invited to join President Franklin D. Roosevelt's Black Cabinet. Roosevelt appointed a total of 45 prominent blacks to positions in executive agencies, and called on them as informal advisers on public policy issues related to African Americans, the Great Depression and the New Deal.

Weaver drafted the U.S Housing Program under Roosevelt, which was established in 1937. The program was intended to provide financial support to local housing departments, as a subsidy toward lowering the rent poor African Americans had to pay. The program decreased the average rent from $19.47 per month to $16.80 per month.  Weaver claimed the scope of this program was insufficient, as there were still many African Americans who made less than the average income. They could not afford to pay for both food and housing. In addition, generally restricted to segregated housing, African Americans could not necessarily take advantage of other subsidized housing.

Chicago

In 1944, Weaver became director of the Commission on Race Relations in the Office of the Mayor of Chicago.  In 1945, he became director of community services for the Chicago-based American Council on Race Relations through 1948.

New York

In 1949, Weaver become director of fellowship opportunities for the John Hay Whitney Foundation.  In 1955, Weaver the first Black State Cabinet member in New York when he became New York State Rent Commissioner under Governor W. Averell Harriman.  In 1960, he became vice chairman of the New York City Housing and Redevelopment Board.

Washington:  HUD

In 1961, Weaver became administrator of the United States Housing and Home Financing Agency (HHFA).   

After election, Kennedy tried to establish a new cabinet department to deal with urban issues. It was to be called the Department of Housing and Urban Development. Postwar suburban development, following the construction of highways, and economic restructuring had drawn population and jobs from the cities. The nation was faced with a stock of substandard, aged housing in many cities, and problems of unemployment.

In 1961, while trying to create HUD, Kennedy had done everything short of promising the new position to Weaver. He appointed him Administrator of the Housing and Home Finance Agency (HHFA), a group of agencies which Kennedy wanted to raise to cabinet status.    

When Dr. Weaver joined the Kennedy Administration, whose Harvard connections extended to the occupant of the Oval Office, he held more Harvard degrees – three, including a doctorate in economics – than anyone else in the administration's upper ranks.

Some Republicans and southern Democrats opposed the legislation to create the new department.  The following year, Kennedy unsuccessfully tried to use his reorganization authority to create the department.  As a result, Congress passed legislation prohibiting presidents from using that authority to create a new cabinet department, although the previous Republican Dwight D. Eisenhower administration had created the cabinet-level U.S. Department of Health, Education, and Welfare under that authority.

He contributed the compilation housing bill in 1961. He took part in lobbying for the Senior Citizens Housing Act of 1962. 

In 1965, Congress approved the department. At the time, Weaver was still Administrator of the HHFA. In public, President Lyndon B. Johnson reiterated Weaver's status as a potential nominee but would not promise him the position. In private, Johnson had strong reservations. He often held pro-and-con discussions with Roy Wilkins, Executive Director of the NAACP.

Johnson wanted a strong proponent for the new department. Johnson worried about Weaver's political sense. Johnson seriously considered other candidates, none of whom was black. He wanted a top administrator, but also someone who was exciting. Johnson was worried about how the new Secretary would interact with congressional representatives from the Solid South; they were overwhelmingly Democrat as most African Americans were still disenfranchised and excluded from the political system. This was expected to change as the federal government enforced civil rights and the provisions of the Voting Rights Act of 1965. As candidates, Johnson considered the politician Richard Daley, mayor of Chicago; and the philanthropist Laurence Rockefeller.

Ultimately, Johnson believed that Weaver was the best-qualified administrator. His assistant Bill Moyers had rated Weaver highly on potential effectiveness as the new secretary. Moyers noted Weaver's strong accomplishments and ability to create teams. Ten days after receiving the report, the president put forward the nomination, and Weaver was successfully confirmed by the United States Senate.

Weaver served as Secretary of United States Department of Housing and Urban Development from 1966 to 1968.

Weaver had expressed his concerns about African Americans' housing issue before 1930 in his article, "Negroes Need Housing", published by the magazine The Crisis of the NAACP after the Stock Market Crash. He noted there was a great difference between the income of most African Americans and the cost of living; African Americans did not have enough housing supply because of many social factors, including the long economic decline of rural areas in the South. He suggested a government housing program to enable all the African Americans the chance to buy or rent their house.

Academia

In 1945, Weaver began teaching at Columbia University.

In 1969, after serving under President Johnson, Weaver became president of Baruch College.

In 1970, Weaver became a distinguished professor of Urban Affairs at Hunter College in New York and taught there until 1978.

Personal life and death

In 1935, Robert C. Weaver married Ella V. Haith.  They adopted a son, who died in 1962.

Weavers served on the boards of Metropolitan Life Insurance Company (1969–1978) and Bowery Savings Bank (1969–1980).  He served in advisory capacities to the United States Controller General (1973–1997), the New City Conciliation and Appeals Board (1973–1984), Harvard University School of Design (1978–1983), the National Association for the Advancement of Colored People (NAACP) Legal Defense Fund and NAACP executive board committee (1978–1997).

Robert C. Weaver died at age 89 on July 17, 1997, in Manhattan, New York.

Honors
Weaver received more than 30 honorary university degrees, as well as the following:
 1962: NAACP Spingarn Medal
 1963:  Russworm Award
 1968: 
 Albert Einstein Commemorative Award
 Merrick Moore Spaulding Award
 1975:  Public Service Award of the US General Accounting Office
 1977:  Frederick Douglass Award of the New York City Urban League
 1978:  Schomberg Collection Award
 1985:  Fellow, American Academy of Arts and Sciences
 1987:  Equal Opportunity Day Award of the National Urban League

Legacy

 2000: Robert C. Weaver Federal Building HUD headquarters (which Weaver had dedicated in 1968)
 2006: "Robert Clifton Weaver Way" NE in Washington, DC
 Undated:  "Robert Weaver Avenue" "Robert Weaver Circle" in Austin, Texas

Works

Weaver wrote a number of books regarding black issues and urban housing, including:
 Negro Labor: A National Problem (1946)
 The Negro Ghetto (1948)
 The Urban Complex: Human Values in Urban Life (1964)
 Dilemmas of Urban America (1965)

Herbert Aptheker reviewed The Negro Ghetto in the August 1948 issue of Masses and Mainstream (successor to the New Masses magazine).

See also
 List of African-American United States Cabinet members
 J. Raymond Jones
 Harlem Clubhouse

References

Further reading 
 
 John C. Walker, The Harlem Fox: J. Raymond Jones at Tammany 1920–1970, New York: State University New York Press, 1989.

Primary sources
 "Weaver, Robert Clifton". Infoplease
 Speech by Robert Weaver given on April 8, 1969. Audio recording from The University of Alabama's Emphasis Symposium on Contemporary Issues

President Johnson discussed Weaver's possible nomination as secretary of HUD with major leaders across the country:

 Telephone Conversation between President Johnson and Martin Luther King Jr., 15 January 1965, 12:06pm, Citation # 6736, Recordings of Telephone Conversations, Lyndon B. Johnson Presidential Library
 Telephone Conversation between President Johnson and Richard Daley, 15 September 1965, 9:40am, Citation # 8870, Recordings of Telephone Conversations, Lyndon B. Johnson Presidential Library
 Telephone Conversation between President Johnson and Richard Daley, 1 December 1965, 9:56am, Citation # 9301, Recordings of Telephone Conversations, Lyndon B. Johnson Presidential Library
 Telephone Conversation between President Johnson and Roy Wilkins, 15 July 1965, 2:40pm, Citation # 8340, Recordings of Telephone Conversations, Lyndon B. Johnson Presidential Library
 Telephone Conversation between President Johnson and Roy Wilkins, 1 November 1965, 10:11am, Citation # 9101, Recordings of Telephone Conversations, Lyndon B. Johnson Presidential Library
 Telephone Conversation between President Johnson and Roy Wilkins, 4 November 1965, 10:50am, Citation # 9106, Recordings of Telephone Conversations, Lyndon B. Johnson Presidential Library
 Telephone Conversation between President Johnson and Roy Wilkins, 5 January 1966, 4:55pm, Citation # 9430, Recordings of Telephone Conversations, Lyndon B. Johnson Presidential Library
 Telephone Conversation between President Johnson and Thurgood Marshall, 3 January 1965, 10:15am, Citation # 9403, Recordings of Telephone Conversations, Lyndon B. Johnson Presidential Library

External links
 

|-

20th-century American politicians
20th-century American economists
20th-century African-American people
African-American economists
United States Secretaries of Housing and Urban Development
African-American members of the Cabinet of the United States
Black Cabinet
Lyndon B. Johnson administration cabinet members
Kennedy administration personnel
Franklin D. Roosevelt administration personnel
Presidents of Baruch College
Hunter College faculty
Harvard Graduate School of Arts and Sciences alumni
Hunter College alumni
Spingarn Medal winners
Washington, D.C., Democrats
Dunbar High School (Washington, D.C.) alumni
1907 births
1997 deaths
New York University faculty